is a series of video games developed by Game Freak and published by Nintendo and The Pokémon Company under the Pokémon media franchise. It was created by Satoshi Tajiri with assistance from Ken Sugimori, the first games, Pocket Monsters Red and Green, were released in 1996 in Japan for the Game Boy, later released outside of Japan as Pokémon Red and Blue. The main series of role-playing video games (RPGs), referred as the "core series" by their developers, have continued on each generation of Nintendo's handhelds. The most recently released core series game, Pokémon Scarlet and Violet, was released on November 18, 2022, for the Nintendo Switch.

In terms of what each main companies does in games, Game Freak develop the main games; Creatures provides support through their Pokémon CG Studio which does 3D models for the Pokémon in the games, as well as developing some spin-off titles; Nintendo was the original publisher of the series and since the 2000s, helps The Pokémon Company publishing the games in their consoles for overseas markets outside of Japan; and The Pokémon Company is then jointly owned by the 3 previously mentioned companies and is set up to deal with the licensing, production, publishing, marketing and deals across the world featuring Pokémon as a media franchise.

The core games are released in generations, each with different Pokémon, storylines, and characters. Remakes of the games are usually released around a decade after the original versions for the latest console at the time. While the main series consists of RPGs developed by Game Freak, many spin-off games based on the series have been developed by various companies, encompassing other genres such as action role-playing, puzzle, fighting, and digital pet games.

Pokémon is one of the highest grossing media franchise franchises of all time, with successful anime series, movies, and merchandise, with spin-off game Pokémon Go having crossed 1billion mobile game downloads worldwide. By November 24, 2017, more than 300 million Pokémon games had been sold worldwide on handheld and home consoles, across 76 titles, including spin-offs. , the series has sold over  units worldwide. This makes Pokémon the third best-selling video game franchise, behind Nintendo's own Mario franchise, and Tetris.

Gameplay 

One of the consistent aspects of most Pokémon games—spanning from Pokémon Red and Blue on the Game Boy to the Nintendo 3DS games Pokémon Ultra Sun and Ultra Moon—is the choice of one of three different Pokémon at the start of the player's adventures; these three are often labeled "starter Pokémon". Players can choose a Pokémon type — Grass-type, Fire-type, or Water-type Pokémon indigenous to that particular region. For example, in Pokémon Red and Blue, the player has the choice of starting with Bulbasaur, Charmander, or Squirtle. The exception to this rule is Pokémon Yellow, where players are given a Pikachu, an Electric-type mouse Pokémon, famous for being the mascot of the Pokémon media franchise; unique to Pokémon Yellow, the three starter Pokémon from Red and Blue can be obtained during the quest by a single player.

Another consistent aspect is that the player's rival will always choose the type that has a type advantage over the player's chosen Pokémon as their starter Pokémon (excluding Sun and Moon and Sword and Shield.). For instance, if the player picks the Fire-type Charmander, the rival will always pick the Water-type Squirtle. This does not affect the first battle between the rivals, as they can only use Normal-type attacks at this point, meaning that they cannot exploit weaknesses. The exception to this is again Pokémon Yellow, in which the rival picks Eevee, a Normal-type Pokémon with multiple evolutions. Sun and Moon also is an exception is this rule, as the rival picks the starter weak toward the player's starter, with the Pokémon that has the type advantage going to a trainer in the Champion battle.

However, in Pokémon Black and White, there are two rivals; one picks the Pokémon with a type advantage over the player's chosen Pokémon, while the other chooses the Pokémon with the type disadvantage. In Pokémon Diamond, Pearl and Platinum, another Trainer chooses the Pokémon with a type disadvantage to the player's chosen Pokémon, but never battles the player; instead, this character battles alongside the player as a tag partner in certain situations.

The situation is similar in Pokémon X and Y, but there are four rivals. Two of them receive the starter Pokémon in an arrangement similar to Pokémon Black and White, but the other two have completely different Pokémon.

Development

All of the licensed Pokémon properties overseen by The Pokémon Company are divided roughly by generation. These generations are roughly chronological divisions by release; when an official sequel in the main role-playing game series is released that features new Pokémon, characters, and possibly new gameplay concepts, that sequel is considered the start of a new generation of the franchise. The main games and their spin-offs, the anime, manga, and trading card game are all updated with the new Pokémon properties each time a new generation begins. The franchise began its ninth and current generation with Pokémon Scarlet and Violet, which were released worldwide for the Nintendo Switch on November 18, 2022.

1996–1998: First generation

The original Pokémon games are Japanese role-playing video games (RPGs) with an element of strategy and were created by Satoshi Tajiri for the Game Boy. The Pokémon series began with the release of Pocket Monsters Red and Green for the Game Boy in Japan. When these games proved popular, an enhanced Blue version was released sometime after, and the Blue version was reprogrammed as Pokémon Red and Blue for international release. The original Green version was not released outside Japan.  Afterwards, a second enhanced remake, Pokémon Yellow, was released to use the color palette of the Game Boy Color and more of a stylistic resemblance to the popular Pokémon anime.

This first generation of games introduced the original 151 species of Pokémon (in National Pokédex order, encompassing all Pokémon from Bulbasaur to Mew), as well as the basic game concepts of capturing, training, battling and trading Pokémon with both computer and human players. These versions of the games take place within the fictional Kanto region, though the name "Kanto" was not used until the second generation.

Spin-off first-generation titles include Pokémon Pinball; an adaptation of the Pokémon Trading Card Game for Game Boy Color; an on-rails photography simulator for Nintendo 64 titled Pokémon Snap; a Nintendo 64 Pokémon-themed adaptation of Tetris Attack, Pokémon Puzzle League. A 3D Nintendo 64 incarnation of the handhelds' battle system, Pokémon Stadium; and a co-starring role for several species in the Nintendo 64 fighting game Super Smash Bros.. At the Nintendo Space World in 2000, a game was revealed briefly with Meowth and Team Rocket singing a song. This was one of the earliest introductions of the Pokémon Togepi and Bellossom. This game was called Meowth's Party, but was not developed into a playable game. Instead, the song/video was played at the end of an episode of Pokémon, and a CD was made for retail in Japan for a limited time. This is the first time Missingno. was discovered.

1999–2001: Second generation

The second generation of Pokémon video games began in 1999 with the Japanese release of Pokémon Gold and Silver for the Game Boy Color, with Australia and North America getting the game in October 2000 and European release date of April 2001. Like the previous generation, an enhanced version, titled Pokémon Crystal, was later released.

This generation introduced 100 new species of Pokémon (starting with Chikorita and ending with Celebi), for a total of 251 Pokémon to collect, train, and battle. New gameplay features include a day-and-night system (reflecting the time of the day in the real world) which influences events in the game; full use of the Game Boy Color's color palette; an improved interface and upgraded inventory system; better balance in the collection of Pokémon and their moves, statistics and equipable items (a new addition); the addition of two new Pokémon types (Dark and Steel) to better balance the strengths and weaknesses of each Pokémon; Pokémon breeding; and a new region named Johto. After exploring Johto, the player can travel east to explore the adjacent Kanto region.

Spin-off games in the second-generation include Pokémon Puzzle Challenge, the adaptation of Pokémon Puzzle League—a puzzle game created by Zoppf industries—made specifically for the Game Boy Color; the Nintendo 64 pet simulator Hey You, Pikachu!; the Pokémon Stadium sequel, Pokémon Stadium 2, for Nintendo 64; several Pokémon mini-games for the e-Reader; and a co-starring role for several Pokémon species in the Super Smash Bros. sequel Super Smash Bros. Melee for the GameCube. The Pokémon mini was a handheld game console released in December 2001 in Japan and 2002 in Europe and North America. This generation started a trend among even-numbered generations, giving the Pokémon Eevee new type evolutions beyond the original three of the first generation.

2002–2005: Third generation

Pokémon entered its third generation with the 2002 release of Pokémon Ruby and Sapphire for Game Boy Advance and continued with the Game Boy Advance remakes of Pokémon Red and Green, Pokémon FireRed and LeafGreen (Red and Green representing the original Japanese first generation games; territories outside Japan instead saw releases of Red and Blue). An enhanced version of Pokémon Ruby and Sapphire titled Pokémon Emerald followed after.

The third generation introduced 135 new Pokémon (starting with Treecko and ending with Deoxys) for a total of 386 species. It also features a more visually detailed environment compared to previous games, "natures" which affect Pokémon stats, a new 2-on-2 Pokémon battling mechanic, a special ability system applying to each Pokémon in battle, the Pokémon Contest sub-game, the new region of Hoenn, the ability to select the protagonist's gender and Secret Bases: customizable "rooms" where the player can display items they have collected in-game and battle against real friends. Secret Bases can be found in bushes, trees, or small cave openings in landscapes by using the Pokémon move, Secret Power, which can be taught to virtually all Pokémon. However, this generation also garnered some criticism for leaving out several gameplay features, including the day-and-night system introduced in the previous generation (which was removed due to internal-battery save problems), and it was also the first installment that encouraged the player to collect merely a selected assortment of the total number of Pokémon rather than every existing species (202 out of 386 species are catchable in the Ruby and Sapphire versions). Around this time that the franchise was regaining its popularity and it managed to ship over 100 million games worldwide.

Third-generation spin-off titles include Pokémon Pinball: Ruby & Sapphire for Game Boy Advance; Pokémon Mystery Dungeon: Blue Rescue Team and Red Rescue Team for Game Boy Advance and Nintendo DS; Pokémon Dash, Pokémon Trozei! and Pokémon Ranger for Nintendo DS; Pokémon Channel and Pokémon Box: Ruby & Sapphire for GameCube; and two role-playing games for the GameCube, consisting of the games Pokémon Colosseum and Pokémon XD: Gale of Darkness.

2006–2009: Fourth generation

In 2006, Japan began the fourth generation of the franchise with the release of Pokémon Diamond and Pearl for Nintendo DS. The games were released in North America on April 22, 2007, and in Australia on June 21, 2007. The game was released in the UK and Europe on July 27, 2007. Other main series games in the fourth generation include Pokémon Platinum, a director's cut version of Diamond and Pearl in the same vein as Pokémon Yellow, Crystal, and Emerald. It was released for the Nintendo DS in Japan on September 13, 2008, in North America on March 22, 2009, and in Australia and Europe on May 14, 2009 and May 22, 2009 respectively. It was also announced that Pokémon Gold and Silver would be remade for the Nintendo DS as Pokémon HeartGold and SoulSilver. Released in Japan on September 12, 2009, the games were later released to North America, Australia, and Europe during March 2010.

The fourth-generation introduces another 107 new species of Pokémon (starting with Turtwig and ending with Arceus), bringing the number of Pokémon species to 493. This generation is the first to have 3D graphics in the main series game, although it is still a mixture of both 3D graphics and sprites. New gameplay concepts include a restructured move-classification system, online multiplayer trading and battling via Nintendo Wi-Fi Connection, the return (and expansion) of the second generation's day-and-night system, the expansion of the third generation's Pokémon Contests into "Super Contests", and the new region of Sinnoh, which has an underground component for multiplayer gameplay in addition to the main overworld. Secret Bases also appear in Sinnoh but can only be created and housed in Sinnoh's underground. HeartGold and SoulSilver also introduced the Pokéathlon to the Johto region, which consists of many Pokémon based sporting events making use of the stylus.

Spin-off games in the fourth generation include the Pokémon Stadium follow-up Pokémon Battle Revolution for Wii (which has Wi-Fi connectivity as well), Pokémon Ranger: Shadows of Almia and Pokémon Ranger: Guardian Signs for Nintendo DS, Pokémon Mystery Dungeon: Explorers of Time and Explorers of Darkness and their sister game, Explorers of Sky all for the Nintendo DS, a co-starring role for Pikachu, Jigglypuff, Lucario, and a Pokémon Trainer (who uses Squirtle, Ivysaur, and Charizard for fighting) in the 2008 Wii fighter Super Smash Bros. Brawl as well as a great adventure for Pikachu and friends in PokéPark Wii: Pikachu's Adventure.

2010–2012: Fifth generation

The fifth generation of Pokémon began on September 18, 2010, with the release of Pokémon Black and White in Japan. They were then released in North America, Europe, and Australia in March 2011. They have released on the Nintendo DS, the same console as its predecessing generation. The games take place in the Unova region. New features include the C-Gear, a feature where players can use Wi-Fi options and customizations; two new battle methods ("Triple Battles", where three Pokémon are sent out at once, and Rotation Battles, where three Pokémon are also sent out at the same time, but the trainer can switch one Pokémon out of the three that are present); "Battle Tests", where trainers battle each other to see who has stronger Pokémon; the Pokémon Musicals (similar to Pokémon Contests), which have trainers use their Pokémon to dance in a theater with other Pokémon; and the ability to not waste Technical Machines (TMs), also when found the first time. The other main series games, and the additions to Black and White, titled Pokémon Black 2 and White 2, are direct sequels. They take place in the Unova region two years later and were released in Japan on June 23, 2012, and in North America, Australia, and Europe in October of that year for Nintendo DS. They are somewhat different of their predecessors; there are different protagonist trainers, and many of the other important characters have changed as well. The games also introduced a new feature, the "Pokémon World Tournament", where trainers can battle gym leaders and champions from older regions, including Unova. The games also broke the tradition of releasing a third version as an addition to the primary versions.

This generation introduced a total of 156 new Pokémon (beginning with Victini and ending with Genesect), the most of any generation so far. It was also the first generation where the first new Pokémon in National Pokédex order (Victini) is not a starter. It also introduced another new feature, the seasons, which two Pokémon (Deerling and Sawsbuck) represent. Unlike previous generations, which would introduce some species of Pokémon that were evolutionary relatives of older-generation Pokémon, the fifth generation's selection was all-original, in an attempt to make the primary versions feel like a brand-new game.

Spin-off fifth generation games include sequels Pokémon Rumble Blast and Pokémon Mystery Dungeon: Gates to Infinity for Nintendo 3DS, PokéPark 2: Wonders Beyond for Wii, and Pokémon Rumble U for Wii U, a downloadable game. Others include Learn with Pokémon: Typing Adventure (a typing game) and Pokémon Conquest (a crossover game) for Nintendo DS, and downloadable reference applications Pokédex 3D, Pokédex 3D Pro (for Nintendo 3DS), and Pokédex for iOS (for iOS devices), which allows players to view information of Pokémon species while they have 3D models. Various fifth generation Pokémon have appeared in Super Smash Bros. for Nintendo 3DS and Wii U and Super Smash Bros. Ultimate including Reshiram and Zekrom, Klinklang, Axew, Druddigon, and more.

2013–2015: Sixth generation

On December 24, 2012, Japanese magazine Nintendo Dream posted a greetings card sent out by Game Freak. In the card, Junichi Masuda exclaimed that during 2013, they intend to further evolve the world of Pokémon. On December 29, 2012, a new Pokémon Black 2 and White 2 commercial aired in Japan, and ending with a message, informing Pokémon fans that the latest news would be announced on January 8, 2013. On January 4, 2013, both the Japanese and English Pokémon website confirmed that an announcement would be made on January 8. On January 7, 2013, the Japanese website explained that the Nintendo president, Satoru Iwata would hold a 10-minute "Pokémon Direct" video conference to announce the big Pokémon news. On January 8, 2013, Satoru Iwata announced the sixth generation of Pokémon, with the new paired games, Pokémon X and Y, which were released on the Nintendo 3DS on October 12, 2013, worldwide. The X and Y games are rendered in full 3D; however, only select parts of the game can be displayed in stereoscopic 3D. The video introduced the player characters, the starter Pokémon; Grass-type Chespin, the Fire-type Fennekin, and the Water-type Froakie, and two other Pokémon, not named until later; a bird-like Pokémon called  having a shape similar to the letter Y and a deer-like Pokémon called  with X-shapes in its eyes. A month later, Sylveon, a new evolved form of Eevee belonging to the games' new Fairy-type was revealed and is currently the last Eeveelution to be revealed. On May 7, 2014, Nintendo revealed the games Pokémon Omega Ruby and Alpha Sapphire in a teaser trailer, remakes of the third generation games Pokémon Ruby and Sapphire. They were released worldwide in November 2014.

This generation introduced a total of 72 new Pokémon, the new Fairy type, Mega Evolution, the Kalos region, Trainer customization, Super Training, and three new battle modes: Sky Battles, Horde Encounters, and Inverse Battle. This generation is also the first to be compatible with Pokémon Bank.

Greninja, the final evolved form of Froakie, would later go on to represent the sixth generation of Pokémon in the hit fighting game, Super Smash Bros. for Nintendo 3DS and Wii U. On August 26, 2014, Pokkén Tournament was announced and was released on July 16, 2015, in Japanese arcades and was released on March 18, 2016, worldwide for Wii U. It was developed by Bandai Namco Entertainment. In July 2016, Niantic and Nintendo released a free-to-play augmented reality game titled Pokémon Go which was released for Android and iOS devices.

2016–2018: Seventh generation

During a Nintendo Direct presentation on February 26, 2016, two new Pokémon titles were announced, titled Pokémon Sun and Moon. The games were released on the Nintendo 3DS on November 18, 2016, in Japan, North America, and Australia, and in Europe on November 23, 2016. The games were the first since the second generation to be backwards-compatible with other titles, including Pokémon X and Y; Pokémon Omega Ruby and Alpha Sapphire; and the Virtual Console re-releases of Pokémon Red, Blue and Yellow. On June 6, 2017, Pokémon Ultra Sun and Ultra Moon were announced. The two games offer new additions to the story of Pokémon Sun and Moon, including new features, and was released worldwide on the Nintendo 3DS on November 17, 2017. On May 29, 2018, two new Pokémon games in the main Pokémon franchise, Pokémon: Let's Go, Pikachu! and Pokémon: Let's Go, Eevee!, were announced. They are remakes of Pokémon Yellow with gameplay mechanics borrowed from Pokémon Go and were released worldwide on the Nintendo Switch on November 16, 2018.

In total, this generation introduced 88 new Pokémon, Alolan forms, trials, Z-moves, Poké Pelago, and Festival Plaza. It was also the first one to introduce Pokémon mid-generation, with five new Pokémon making their debut in Pokémon Ultra Sun and Ultra Moon, and two new Pokémon debuting in Let's Go, Pikachu! and Let's Go, Eevee!

2019–2021: Eighth generation

During E3 2017, Nintendo and The Pokémon Company announced that Game Freak was developing a new core Pokémon role-playing game set to release for the Nintendo Switch in "2018 or later." The game is the eighth generation of Pokémon.Along with the announcement of Pokémon: Let's Go, Pikachu! and Pokémon: Let's Go, Eevee! it was confirmed that another core Pokémon role-playing game would be released in late 2019. It was clarified that the 2019 game was the one mentioned during E3 2017, not the Let's Go games. Game director Junichi Masuda stated that it would also "follow in the tradition of Pokémon X and Y and Pokémon Sun and Moon". The CEO of The Pokémon Company, Tsunekazu Ishihara, also confirmed that the upcoming core title would not have influences from Pokémon Go like Let's Go, Pikachu! and Let's Go, Eevee! had. On February 27, 2019, on the 23rd anniversary of the franchise, Pokémon Sword and Shield were confirmed for Nintendo Switch, which were released worldwide on November 15, 2019. Pokémon Sword and Shield takes place in the Galar region introducing new Pokémon, Galarian forms, the Champion Cup, Dynamax, Gigantamax forms, Max Raid battles, and Pokémon Camp. On January 9, 2020, two expansion packs titled The Isle of Armor and The Crown Tundra were announced. The Isle of Armor was released on June 17, 2020, and The Crown Tundra was released on October 22, 2020. On February 26, 2021, Brilliant Diamond and Shining Pearl were announced, remakes of the fourth generation games Pokémon Diamond and Pearl developed by ILCA and set to release later that year. On the same day, Pokémon Legends: Arceus was announced, a prequel to Diamond and Pearl. Brilliant Diamond and Shining Pearl were released on November 19, 2021, while Pokémon Legends: Arceus was released on January 28, 2022.

This generation introduced a total of 96 new Pokémon with 81 revealed in Sword and Shield, 8 revealed in the expansion packs, and 7 revealed in Pokémon Legends: Arceus.

On March 6, 2020, the remake of the Mystery Dungeon, Red and Blue Rescue Team was released titled Pokémon Mystery Dungeon: Rescue Team DX On November 26, 2020, at the Macy's Thanksgiving parade, Pokémon teased its 2021 25th anniversary logo and details for its special celebration "soon".

2022–present: Ninth generation

On February 27, 2022, Pokémon Scarlet and Violet were announced for the Nintendo Switch, with a late 2022 release date. The games were released on November 18, 2022. 

 
This generation introduced a total of 103 new Pokémon so far giving a total of 1008 Pokémon overall.

Games

Other games

Several Pokémon PC games were released for Microsoft Windows and Macintosh. Games from the franchise were also released in Japan for Sega consoles Pico and Advanced Pico Beena. Pokémon are also in Mario Artist: Paint Studio for Nintendo 64DD as pasteable stickers, and they also appear in Picross NP Vol. 1 for the Super Nintendo Entertainment System.

Super Smash Bros. series 
In the Super Smash Bros. series, Pikachu, Ivysaur, Squirtle, Charizard, Jigglypuff, Pichu, Mewtwo, Lucario, Greninja, and Incineroar have been playable characters. Pikachu and Jigglypuff are introduced in Super Smash Bros. for the Nintendo 64, and appear in every installment of the franchise. Pichu and Mewtwo feature as playable characters in Super Smash Bros. Melee for the GameCube. In Super Smash Bros. Brawl for the Wii, Mewtwo and Pichu are not featured as playable characters, although Squirtle, Ivysaur, and Charizard make their first playable appearances as part of the Pokémon Trainer character, while Lucario appears as a separate character. Greninja made its first appearance in Super Smash Bros. for Nintendo 3DS and Wii U, Charizard is a standalone character, and Mewtwo returns as a downloadable content character. All of the Pokémon that are playable in previous Smash Bros. games return in the Nintendo Switch game Super Smash Bros. Ultimate, which also features Incineroar. Squirtle, Ivysaur, and Charizard are again playable as a part of the Pokémon Trainer character in Ultimate. Some of the Pokémon also appear as Spirits. Rayquaza is featured as a boss enemy in Super Smash Bros. Brawl. The series features Poké Balls as items, which, when used by a player, make a random Pokémon appear including Piplup, Bonsly, and Munchlax, with various effects on the game, and Super Smash Bros. for Nintendo 3DS and Wii U have Master Balls, which function like Poké Balls but only summon a rare Pokémon (like Mew, Palkia, and Genesect) or Goldeen. Several Pokémon also appear as stage hazards/in stages, including Rayquaza, Ho-Oh and Manaphy.

Reception 

After the first five months of release, the Game Boy games sold almost 3 million copies. They have been credited as a factor in the Game Boy maintaining strong sales in Japan well beyond the typical lifespan of a game system. The series has sold over 279 million units (inclusive of spin-off titles; 210 million for the mainline Pokémon games) as of February 29, 2016, giving it the distinction of being one of the best-selling video game series in history. Guinness World Records awarded the Pokémon series eight records in Guinness World Records: Gamer's Edition 2008, including "Most Successful RPG Series of All Time", "Game Series With the Most Spin-Off Movies" and "Most Photosensitive Epileptic Seizures Caused by a TV Show". , the series has sold over  units.

The Pokémon video game series is the basis of the Pokémon franchise, which includes the Pokémon anime, the Pokémon Trading Card Game, the Pokémon manga, and various toys. The anime series has run for over 900 episodes, accompanied by 19 feature films, with a twentieth in production. The trading card game and its expansion sets have grown to around 3,000 unique cards in total, and continue to draw a healthy player base to its official international tournaments. The extent of global toy and merchandise sales since 1996 cover broad markets and high quantities.

IGN ranked Pokémon as the 17th greatest desired game series: "the basic gameplay premise boasts solid, addictive play mechanics, and several of the handheld RPGs deserve to be in every gamer's collection. GamesRadar listed Pokémon as the No. 1 Nintendo game "not made by Nintendo", stating that having to catch each Pokémon made the games addictive.

See also 
 List of Japanese role-playing game franchises

Notes

References

External links 
 
 Official Japanese website 

 
Video game franchises introduced in 1996
Video game franchises
Video games adapted into comics
Nintendo franchises
Video games adapted into films
Video games adapted into television shows
Role-playing video games